Anjar is one of the 182 Legislative Assembly constituencies of Gujarat state in India. It is numbered as 4-Anjar.

It is part of Kachchh district.

List of segments
This assembly seat represents the following segments,

 Anjar Taluka – Entire taluka except village – Varsana
 Bhuj Taluka (Part) Villages – Dhrang, Lodai, Vantra, Dharampur, Jawaharnagar, Lothia, Modsar, Mokhana, Dagala, Naliyeri Timbo, Nadapa, Habay, Chapreli, Boladi, Jikadi, Paiya, Sangada Timbo, Sarspar, Rudrani, Nagor, Trambau, Varnora Nana, Raydhanpar, Varnora Mota, Galpadar, Kali Talavdi, Mamuara, Kanaiyabe, Ukhad Mora, Dhaneti, Vadvara, Padhar, Lakhond, Traya, Purasar, Gado, Bhujodi, Kukma, Reldi Moti, Reldi Nani, Kanderai, Chubdak, Gandher, Saiyedpar, Vavdi, Vadva, Ler, Jadura, Reha Mota, Tharavada Nana, Tharavada Mota, Sakrai Timbo, Hajapar, Harudi, Reha Nana, Sanosara, Sapar Timbo, Bharapar, Baladiya, Kotda Athamana, Jambudi, Kotda Ugamana, Varli, Bandhara Nana, Chakar, Bandhara Mota, Vadzar, Zumkha, Kera, Ghoghra Timbo, Palara.

Members of Legislative Assembly

Election results

2022

2017

2012

2007

2002

1998

1995

1990

1985

1980

1975

1972

1967

1962

See also
 List of constituencies of the Gujarat Legislative Assembly
 Kachchh district

References

External links
 

Assembly constituencies of Gujarat
Politics of Kutch district